Svayamvara, in ancient India, was a method of marriage in which a woman chose a man as her husband from a group of suitors. In this context,  in Sanskrit means 'self' and  means 'groom'. The bride wishing to marry would select an auspicious time and venue and then broadcast her intentions. Kings typically sent messengers to outside lands, while commoners simply spread the news within the local community. On the appointed day, suitors would gather at the venue and declare their qualifications. The bride would place a garland on the man of her choice and a marriage ceremony was held immediately.

Indian literature

Sīta
In the Hindu epic Ramayana, King Janaka proclaimed that Sita would be wed to the man who could lift and string the Shiva Dhanush (Shiva's bow), calling this feat , meaning the cost to be paid by a suitor. Sita married Rama, the only man strong enough to lift and string the bow.

Kunti
King Kuntibhoja arranged a svayamvara for his adopted daughter Kunti in the Hindu epic Mahabharata. Many kings and princes from the Aryan region attended her svayamvara. Among them was Pandu, the king of Hastinapura. Kunti chose Pandu as her husband.

Draupadī

For Draupadī, the daughter of King Drupada of Panchala in the Mahabharata, aspirants had to hit a fish's eye with a bow and arrow. This fish was just an image on a rotating wheel placed over a pan filled with oil. The many suitors had to aim using the reflection of the fish in the oil.

Damayanti
Another famous svayamvara from the Mahabharata is found in the story of Damayanti, who chose Nala for her husband, against the wishes of the gods.

Modern literature

The Bearded Prince tells the story of Princess Roopali, whose father holds a svayamvara for her to select her groom.

Roshani Chokshi's The Star-Touched Queen has the heroine Maya's father stage a svayamvara for her early in the novel.

Iranian literature

Kitayun 
The Shahnama of Ferdausi records a similar tradition in pre-Islamic Iran, of one Kitayun, eldest daughter of the Emperor of Constantinople, selecting the Iranian Gushtasp. With a view to procure a husband for one of his daughters, the Byzantine emperor determined to hold a grand assembly of illustrious and wise men for her to see and select from. She did not find a suitable husband in the first assembly, so a second one was held, where she placed the crown on Gushtasp's head. Gushtasp, also known as Vishtaspa, returned to Iran with his bride and was crowned King.

Rum (literally "Rome") was the common name used for the Eastern Roman or Byzantine Empire by Middle Eastern people.

See also
Dhanushadham
Bride-show

References

Further reading

  Accessed 22 Dec. 2022. 
  Accessed 22 Dec. 2022.
  Accessed 22 Dec. 2022.
  Accessed 22 Dec. 2022.
  Accessed 22 Dec. 2022.
  Accessed 22 Dec. 2022.

Marriage in India
Ancient India